Orlanci is a village in the municipality of Aračinovo, Republic of North Macedonia.

Demographics
According to the 1467-68 Ottoman defter, Orlanci appears as being inhabited by an Orthodox Albanian population. Some families had a mixed Slav-Albanian anthroponomy - usually a Slavic first name and an Albanian last name or last names with Albanian patronyms and Slavic suffixes. 

The names are: Oliver son of Tanush, Tan-ço son of Stamat, poor Tan-o (siromah), poor Goja (siromah), Dejan son of Kalin, Oliver son of Tanush, Tushko son of Oliver.  

According to the 2021 census, the village had a total of 890 inhabitants. Ethnic groups in the village include:

Albanians: 857
Bosniaks: 4
Other: 29

References

Villages in Aračinovo Municipality
Albanian communities in North Macedonia